Dallia delicatissima is a species of mudminnow in the genus Dallia of the order Esociformes. It is endemic to the Chukchi Peninsula in far eastern Siberia, Russia, being known from only two lakes of the Kolychiskaya Guba Bay basin: Pil'khykai Lagoon, and a nameless lake in the upper river Kalheurer-veyemm, flowing into the southwestern part of the Kolyuchin Bay.

Conservation Status 
In March of 2020, the IUCN's red list assessed this species to be Least Concern due to its remote habitat and lack of use to humans.

References 

Umbridae
Fish described in 1881